The 2009 German motorcycle Grand Prix was the ninth round of the 2009 Grand Prix motorcycle racing season. It took place on the weekend of 17–19 July 2009 at the Sachsenring, located in Hohenstein-Ernstthal, Germany.

The MotoGP race was won by Valentino Rossi who finished ahead of teammate Jorge Lorenzo.

MotoGP classification

250 cc classification
The 250cc race was originally scheduled to run for 29 laps, but due to heavy rain it was red-flagged and then restarted, with the new distance consisting of 19 laps only.

125 cc classification

Championship standings after the race (MotoGP)
Below are the standings for the top five riders and constructors after round nine has concluded.

Riders' Championship standings

Constructors' Championship standings

 Note: Only the top five positions are included for both sets of standings.

References

German motorcycle Grand Prix
German
Motorcycle Grand Prix